"Follow the Rules'" is a 1996 song recorded by Italian electronic music group Livin' Joy and singer Tameko Star. It was released as the third single from their only album, Don't Stop Movin. It was the follow-up to "Don't Stop Movin'", which had been a number-one hit in Italy. The new single peaked at number three on the Italian singles chart, number nine in the UK and number twelve in Finland. It can be described as an anthemic dance track based around the message of following your dreams and making them come true. In style it was similar to its predecessor, but with a heavier piano house/organ sound.

Critical reception
A reviewer from Music Week rated the song four out of five, describing it as "another storming anthem", that "will be another biggie and rouse interest in the album". Damien Mendis from the magazine's RM Dance Update" praised the track, giving it five out of five. He added that "now Visnadi and DJ Vioni are set to repeat that success [of "Don't Stop Movin'"] with another smash — and a possible number one? All their trademark elements are present to ensure maximum familiarity — in no less than nine mixes too. if you fancy a Classic Def moment then check Satoshi Tomiie's mixes. They stay very close to the original with enough juice to play in slightly less commercial clubs. Pure unashamed perfect pop dance. Love it." Pop Rescue noted that it "has some delicious Italia House piano over a great dance beat", complimenting it as "a positive uplifting track".

Chart performance
Proving to be a moderate success for Livin' Joy across Europe, the single was a Top 10 hit in Italy, where it hit number three, and in the UK. On the UK Singles Chart, it managed to stay in the sales charts for five weeks after entering and peaking at number nine in mid-October 1996. Additionally, it reached number twelve in Finland, number sixteen in Scotland, number 28 in Ireland and number 29 in Sweden. On the Eurochart Hot 100, it peaked at number 27 in November 1996. Outside Europe, the single was successful in Israel, peaking at number eight and it also charted in Australia, reaching number 73.

Airplay
In the UK, "Follow the Rules" received more than 500 plays a week on mainstream radio at its peak and around 45 regional radio stations were giving it support. After the success of "Dreamer" and "Don't Stop Movin'", radio stations were keen to play the track. On Capital Radio, it was the most popular of the three songs, while Atlantic 252 couldn't get enough of it, spinning it 54 times in the week it dropped out of the Top 40. Dance station Galaxy was playing it 50 times a week at the end of October and start of November 1996, while Radio One gave it between 15-18 plays per week, balancing out a guitar-led playlist. Livin 'Joy also benefited from television exposure and their performance on the Smash Hits Poll Winners' Party helped bring the act out to a wider audience.

Music video
A music video was produced to promote the single. It was published on YouTube in March 2018.

Track listing

Charts

References

 

1996 singles
1996 songs
Livin' Joy songs
MCA Records singles
English-language Italian songs